Emilio Sánchez was the defending champion, but lost in the second round to Francisco Roig.

Carlos Costa won the title by defeating Magnus Gustafsson 6–4, 7–6(7–3), 6–4 in the final.

Seeds
The first eight seeds received a bye into the second round.

Draw

Finals

Top half

Section 1

Section 2

Bottom half

Section 3

Section 4

References

External links
 Official results archive (ATP)
 Official results archive (ITF)

1992 ATP Tour